The Harvard Faculty of Arts and Sciences (FAS) is the largest of the ten faculties that constitute Harvard University.

Headquartered principally in Cambridge, Massachusetts, and centered in the historic Harvard Yard, FAS is the only faculty responsible for both undergraduate and graduate education. FAS administers the courses offered at Harvard College, the Harvard Graduate School of Arts and Sciences, The John A. Paulson School of Engineering and Applied Sciences (SEAS), and the Harvard Division of Continuing Education. It is headed by Dean Claudine Gay.

As of Fall 2019, FAS comprised 1221 total faculty, including 719 tenured and tenure-track professors as well as 502 other professors, lecturers, preceptors, and visiting faculty in some 30 academic departments in the arts and humanities, the social sciences, the natural sciences, and the engineering and applied sciences. There are approximately 6,800  undergraduates (Harvard College) and 4,500 graduate students (Harvard Graduate School of Arts and Sciences). The Harvard Division of Continuing Education welcomes more than 30,000 students annually in its open enrollment courses. In 2019, FAS had a budget of $1.6 billion and a revenue of $1.6 billion.

As of 2019, the FAS endowment had a market value of $17.5 billion. Harvard's total endowment stands at $40.9 billion.

Organization
FAS consists of the following divisions:

 Harvard College (established 1636)
 The Graduate School of Arts and Sciences (GSAS) (established 1872)
 The John A. Paulson School of Engineering and Applied Sciences (SEAS) (established 1847)
 The Division of Continuing Education (DCE) (established 1871)

Commonly FAS is broken down only into the college, the GSAS, and the Extension School. This is because SEAS does not award degrees. Undergraduate concentrators as well as master's and doctoral students in the engineering and applied science departments instead receive their degrees from the College and the GSAS, respectively.

In addition, FAS includes 35 research centers, institutes, and interdisciplinary programs, eleven museums, and numerous libraries.

The dean of FAS serves as the chief administrative and academic officer, responsible to the president and provost of Harvard University for all aspects of the division's operations, including budgets, planning, support services, faculty appointments, curricula, student affairs, and fundraising. The dean is appointed by the president with the approval of the university's two governing boards, the Harvard Corporation and the Harvard Board of Overseers, and serves at the pleasure of the president. The dean of FAS is invariably drawn from the ranks of the tenured faculty in the division. The current dean, Claudine Gay, assumed the position in August 2018. The deans of Harvard College, GSAS, SEAS, and DCE report to the dean of FAS, as do various academic deans, administrative deans (including those responsible for finance, development, faculty personnel policy, undergraduate admissions and financial aid), and the directors of various research centers and institutes.

History
While Harvard College traces its origins to 1636, the body called the Faculty of Arts and Sciences only came into existence in the late nineteenth century. From 1820 until 1872, Harvard University consisted of the college and three professional schools (in law, medicine, and divinity). The governing boards established a Graduate Department in 1872 to administer and recommend candidates for the degrees of Master of Arts, Master of Science, Doctor of Philosophy, and Doctor of Science. In 1890, the governing boards merged separate faculties of the Lawrence Scientific School and the College into a single Faculty of Arts and Sciences. The Graduate Department later became the Graduate School of Arts and Sciences.

The Lawrence Scientific School opened in 1847 and marked Harvard's first major effort to offer a formal program in science and engineering. In 1948, the School merged with the Department of Engineering Sciences and Applied Physics in FAS to form the Division of Engineering and Applied Sciences. In 2007, the Division of Engineering and Applied Sciences formally became the School of Engineering and Applied Sciences. On June 3, 2015, the School of Engineering and Applied Sciences was renamed the Harvard John A. Paulson School of Engineering and Applied Sciences, following a $400 million gift by Harvard Business School alumnus John A. Paulson.

References

External links